Richard Abraham was an English politician who was MP for Portsmouth in 1437. History of Parliament Online claims that he may have been a son of Henry Abraham.

References

English MPs 1437
Members of the Parliament of England (pre-1707) for Portsmouth